The Rugby Nordic Cup is the biggest club rugby union tournament in Scandinavia, annually pitching the champions of each Nordic country against each other to find out who is the best. It is not to be confused with the Nordic Cup (rugby league) tournament, which is a rugby league competition.

References
 https://web.archive.org/web/20090709083801/http://www.rugby.no/Oslo/nordiccup.asp

Rugby union competitions in Europe for national teams
International rugby union competitions hosted by Sweden
Rugby union in Norway
Inter-Nordic sports competitions